Sölvesborg Municipality (Sölvesborgs kommun) is a municipality in Blekinge County in South Sweden in southern Sweden. It borders to Bromölla Municipality, Olofström Municipality and Karlshamn Municipality. The town Sölvesborg is the seat of the municipality.

The present municipality was formed in 1971 when the City of Sölvesborg was amalgamated with the rural municipalities Gammalstorp and Mjällby.

Politics
The Sölvesborg Party was formed ahead of the 2002 election by a group of former Green Party members. Party councillors are Dan Boberg and Bo Sandquist.

In the 2002 elections the party got 4.7% of the votes (472 votes) and two seats in the municipal assembly (kommunfullmäktige)

In the 2006 elections the party got 2.7% of the votes (277 votes) and one seat in the municipal assembly.

The municipality otherwise reflect the same political majorities as in its neighbouring municipalities of Bromölla, Olofström and Karlshamn.

In December 2018 Louise Erixon, partner of Jimmie Åkesson, the populist party's leader of Sweden Democrats, was made mayor of Sölvesborg.

Localities
There are 10 urban areas (also called a Tätort or locality) in Sölvesborg Municipality.

In the table the localities are listed according to the size of the population as of December 31, 2005. The municipal seat is in bold characters.

A minor part of Valje is also situated in the municipality. The main part of Valje is, however, in Bromölla Municipality.

Parishes
All parishes belonged to Lister Hundred:
Gammalstorp Parish
Mjällby Parish
Sölvesborg Parish
Ysane Parish

International relations

Twin towns — Sister cities
Sölvesborg is twinned with:

 Bornholm in Denmark (since 1947, until 2003 Nexø)
 Malbork in Poland (since 1999)
 Wolgast in Germany (since 1994)
 Sortavala in Russia (since 1997)
 Ukmerge in Lithuania (since 2000)

References

External links

Sölvesborg Municipality  - Official site

 
Municipalities of Blekinge County